Indian Institute of Integrative Medicine is a premier institute located in Jammu under the Council of Scientific & Industrial Research, Government of India and dedicated to the research of drug discovery.

References

External links
http://www.iiim.res.in/index.php

Council of Scientific and Industrial Research
Research institutes in Jammu and Kashmir
Multidisciplinary research institutes
Educational institutions established in 1941
1941 establishments in India
BSL3 laboratories in India